Diphtherocome pallida is a species of moth of the  family Noctuidae. It is found in India.

References

Moths described in 1867
Acronictinae